In sociology and organizational studies, institutional theory is a theory on the deeper and more resilient aspects of social structure. It considers the processes by which structures, including schemes, rules, norms, and routines, become established as authoritative guidelines for social behavior. Different components of institutional theory explain how these elements are created, diffused, adopted, and adapted over space and time; and how they fall into decline and disuse.

Overview 
In defining institutions, according to William Richard Scott (1995, 235), there is "no single and universally agreed definition of an 'institution' in the institutional school of thought." Scott (1995:33, 2001:48) asserts that: 

According to Scott (2008), institutional theory is "a widely accepted theoretical posture that emphasizes productivity, ethics, and legitimacy." Researchers building on this perspective emphasize that a key insight of institutional theory is ethics: rather than necessarily optimizing their decisions, practices, and structures, organizations look to their peers for cues to appropriate behavior. 

According to Kraft's Public Policy (2007): Institutional Theory is "Policy-making that emphasizes the formal and legal aspects of government structures."

Schools of institutional theory 

There are two dominant trends in institutional theory:
 Old institutionalism
 New institutionalism

Powell and DiMaggio (1991) define an emerging perspective in sociology and organizational studies, which they term the 'new institutionalism', as rejecting the rational-actor models of Classical economics.  Instead, it seeks cognitive and cultural explanations of social and organizational phenomena by considering the properties of supra-individual units of analysis that cannot be reduced to aggregations or direct consequences of individuals’ attributes or motives.

Scott (1995) indicates that, in order to survive, organisations must conform to the rules and belief systems prevailing in the environment (DiMaggio and Powell, 1983; Meyer and Rowan, 1977), because institutional isomorphism, both structural and procedural, will earn the organisation legitimacy (Dacin, 1997; Deephouse, 1996; Suchman, 1995). For instance, multinational corporations (MNCs) operating in different countries with varying institutional environments will face diverse pressures. Some of those pressures in host and home institutional environments are testified to exert fundamental influences on competitive strategy (Martinsons, 1993; Porter, 1990) and human resource management (HRM) practices (Rosenzweig and Singh, 1991; Zaheer, 1995; cf. Saqib, Allen and Wood, 2021). Corporations also face institutional pressures from their most important peers: peers in their industry and peers in their local (headquarters) community; for example, Marquis and Tilcsik (2016) show that corporate philanthropic donations are largely driven by isomorphic pressures that companies experience from their industry peers and local peers. Non-governmental organisations (NGOs) and social organizations can also be susceptible to isomorphic pressures.

More recent work in the field of institutional theory has led to the emergence of new concepts such as

- institutional logics, a concept pioneered by Friedland & Alford (1991) and later by Thornton, Ocasio & Lounsbury (2012). The institutional logic perspective mostly take a structural and macro approach to institutional analysis

- institutional work, a concept pioneered by Lawrence & Suddaby, (2006). By contrast with the logic perspective, it gives agentic power to social actors, and assumes those actors can influence institutions - either maintaining or disrupting them.

A recent stream of research looks at the intersection of space and place (with inspirations coming from geography) and institutional theory. Rodner et al. (2020) mobilize Lefebvre to show how institutional work can be spatial by nature, in the context of the disruption of the cultural sector in Venezuela under Chavez. They also differentiate the institutional conception of place vs space.

Challenges in different types of economies 
There is substantial evidence that firms in different types of economies react differently to similar challenges (Knetter, 1989). Social, economic, and political factors constitute an institutional structure of a particular environment which provides firms with advantages for engaging in specific types of activities there. Businesses tend to perform more efficiently if they receive the institutional support.

Deinstitutionalization 
Not to be confused with the deinstitutionalization (i.e. closure) of psychiatric hospitals, this term is also used by some researchers in the institutional theory literature to think about the different ways that an undesirable institution might be disrupted. For example, Maguire and Hardy (2009) examined the processes leading to the deinstitutionalization of DDT. This might include social movements from particular groups, such as the efforts leading to prohibition to deinstitutionalize the drinking of alcoholic beverages, or the social and institutional pressures that led to the deinstitutionalization of permanent employment in Japan. Public opinion can also lead to the deinstitutionalization of a practice, at least according to Clemente and Roulet (2015).

Deinstitutionalization may also be used in partial ways, as seen in the deinstitutionalization of particular CSR concepts to make way for a new CSR construct, or in the deinstitutionalization of the practice of catching fish for sustenance.

See also

 Institutional logics
 Institutional work
 Institutional analysis
 Institutional economics

References

Political science theories